Mulbekh Monastery or Mulbekh Gompa consist of two gompas, one Drukpa and one Gelugpa Buddhist monastery in Kargil, Ladakh, northern India.
Names of the monasteries are Serdung Gompa and Rgaldan-se Gompa of Drukpa and Gelugpa sect respectively. Rgaldan-se Gompa was established by Tungba Lzawa also known as Agu Tungba.   Recently the Rgaldan-se Gompa was reconstructed in 2016.
It also consist a Lhakhang known as Nyima Lhakhang, it is the oldest section of the Mulbekh Monastery.
It is believed to be built around 800 year ago by the students of great Tibetan scholar Lotsawa Rinchen Zangpo, it is clear with the style of painting.

Description
The double gompas are dramatically situated at the very top of a crag 200 metres (656 ft) above the road. They were connected with the nearby palace of Rajah kalon of Mulbekh below. They may be reached by a steep footpath winding up from behind.

The altitude of the town at the foot of the crag is given as 3,304 m. (10,839 ft), which makes the altitude of the gompas 3,504 m. (11,495 ft). Its population is given as 5,730.

Chamba Statue and Inscriptions
Around 45 kilometre east of Kargil town heading toward Leh, is the famous Chamba Statue in Mulbekh village, a striking enormous figure carved into the rock face on the right hand side of the road. It pictures a standing Maitreya Buddha or Buddha-to-come overlooking the old trade route and modern highway. Some people believe it dates to the Kushan period in the early centuries CE. Modern scholars date it as being from around the eighth century. Unfortunately, the lower part of the statue is partly obscured by a small temple built in 1975.

Nearby are some ancient inscriptions written in Kharosthi script. There is also an edict issued to the local people to discontinue sacrificing goats by King Lde, who ruled western Ladakh c. 1400 CE, while his younger brother, Dragspa, ruled the rest.

Every year at least once or twice in each village the heart was torn out of a living goat in front of an altar. King Lde had the following inscription carved:

Oh Lama (Tsongkapa [1378-1441 CE]), take notice of this! The king of faith, Bum lde, having seen the fruits of works in the future life, gives orders to the men of Mulbe to abolish, above all, the living sacrifices, and greets the Lama. The living sacrifices are abolished."

The people of Mulbekh found this too onerous to follow, for beside King Lde's edict, on the same rock, is an inscription saying the order was too hard to be executed. "For what would the local deity say, if the goat were withheld from him?"

Footnotes

References
http://jktourism.org/index.php/mulbekh-chamba
 Francke, A. H. (1977). A History of Ladakh. First edition 1907. 1977 reprint with Critical Introduction and Annotations by S. S. Gergan & F. M. Hassnain. Sterling Publishers, New Delhi.
 Rizvi, Janet. (1996). Ladakh: Crossroads of High Asia. Second Edition. Oxford India Paperbacks. 3rd Impression 2001. .
 Schettler, Margret & Rolf (1981). Kashmir, Ladakh & Zanskar. Lonely Planet. South Yarra, Victoria, Australia.

Buddhist monasteries in Ladakh
Tibetan Buddhist monasteries